The Rondeau M378 is a Group 6 sports prototype race car, designed, developed and built by Automobile Jean Rondeau, in 1978, and was their second car. It competed in one World Sportscar Championship sports car racing event; the 1978 24 Hours of Le Mans. It was driven by Bernard Darniche, Jacky Haran, Jean Rondeau, and its best result was a 9th-place finish at that year's event. This drove the rear wheels through a Hewland 5-speed manual transmission.

References

Group 6 (racing) cars
Sports prototypes